Last Shot: A Final Four Mystery is a young adult novel by John Feinstein. It tells the story of two young reporters, Stevie Thomas and Susan Carol Anderson, who stumble upon a plot to blackmail fictional Minnesota State basketball player Chip Graber into throwing the Final Four in New Orleans.

Plot 

Though reluctant, Stevie's parents allow him to skip school and travel to New Orleans where he will write alongside the other winner of the contest, Susan Carol. Together, they stumble across a scandal between gamblers and a star NCAA basketball player Chip Graber.  They also stop Chip Graber from throwing the game away.

External links

John Feinstein's author page on Random House Books
Feinstein on the Brink

2006 American novels
American sports novels
American young adult novels
American mystery novels
Edgar Award-winning works
Basketball books
Novels set in Minnesota
Novels set in New Orleans